Parting Ways was an African-American settlement of freedmen adjacent to present-day Route 80 in Plymouth, Massachusetts, near the Plymouth/Kingston town line. Other names for Parting Ways include the Parting Ways Archeological District and the Parting Ways New Guinea Settlement. They were granted  their freedom by the Massachusetts courts due to their service in the war. The land was granted in 1792 as part of an agreement with the town of Plymouth, that whosoever could clear the land could claim ownership of it. Part of this land was added to the National Register of Historic Places on April 19, 1979.

The site consists of a cemetery, trash middens, and the foundations of the families' houses.  This site was excavated in the middle 1970s by an archaeological team headed by Dr. James Deetz, a professor of anthropology at Brown University and assistant director at Plimoth Plantation.  In the chapter entitled, "Parting Ways," in his 1977 book, In Small Things Forgotten, Deetz demonstrates that 18th and early 19th century African Americans retained certain ethnically distinctive folkways of African origin.  Their houses were arranged in the distinctive shotgun house style, and their meat was butchered by chopping, whereas their white neighbors butchered by sawing across the bones. Deetz' shotgun house interpretation of the extremely limited evidence - two rooms that "may or may not have been unified" - has been challenged as "premature".

See also
 National Register of Historic Places listings in Plymouth County, Massachusetts

References

External links

See Plymouth page on Parting Ways
Parting Ways Plymouth - Tribute to Old Museum
National Register of Historic Places
Find a Grave site on Parting Ways Cemetery

Historic districts in Plymouth County, Massachusetts
African-American history of Massachusetts
Archaeological sites in Massachusetts
Buildings and structures in Plymouth, Massachusetts
Populated places in Plymouth County, Massachusetts
Cemeteries on the National Register of Historic Places in Massachusetts
Populated places established by African Americans
Cemeteries in Plymouth County, Massachusetts
Archaeological sites on the National Register of Historic Places in Massachusetts
National Register of Historic Places in Plymouth County, Massachusetts
Historic districts on the National Register of Historic Places in Massachusetts
Cemeteries established in the 1790s